Stephen Henry Burum, A.S.C. (born November 25, 1939) is an American cinematographer.

Biography
Burum was born in Dinuba, California, a small Central Valley town near Visalia. He graduated from the UCLA School of Theater, Film and Television in the 1960s, and became an instructor at the same school. He began his professional filmmaking career working on the Walt Disney anthology television series, and then was drafted into the U.S. Army and assigned to the Army Pictorial Center, for whom he shot army training films. Returning to California after his service was complete, he worked on commercials, television shows, and low-budget films; he won a technical Emmy for his special-effects work on the popular public television astronomy series Cosmos: A Personal Voyage. He began working on major feature films for Francis Ford Coppola in 1976, shooting the second unit of Apocalypse Now and then The Black Stallion. His first credit as the cinematographer of a major motion picture was for The Escape Artist (1982).

In 2007,  Burum returned to UCLA as the Kodak Cinematographer in Residence.

Awards and honors
Burum was nominated for the  American Society of Cinematographers Award for Outstanding Achievement in Cinematography in Theatrical Releases in 1988 and 1990 for his work on the films The Untouchables and The War of the Roses, finally winning in 1993 for his work on Hoffa.
He was also nominated for an Academy Award for Hoffa but did not win.

Burum was the 2008 recipient of the American Society of Cinematographers' Lifetime Achievement Award.

Filmography

Film

Television

References

External links 
 

1939 births
Living people
American cinematographers
People from Visalia, California
UCLA Film School alumni
UCLA School of Theater, Film and Television faculty